A nationalist refers to anything associated with or part of nationalism. Nationalism is an idea or movement that promotes the interests of a particular nation.

A Nationalist may refer to an adherent of:

Political organizations
 Kuomintang - "The Nationalists" of China, members of a political organization established in 1894 by Sun Yat-sen. Later in 1949, this party and its members fled to Taiwan.
 Nationalist faction (Spanish Civil War) - "The Nationalists" of the Spanish Civil War led by Francisco Franco
 Nationalist Clubs - "The Nationalists" belonging to an American political movement advancing the ideas of Edward Bellamy
 Nationalist Movement - a political organization based in the U.S. state of Mississippi
 Nationalist Party (Iceland) - a political party existing from 1934 to 1944
 National Party (South Africa) - a political party existing from 1915 to 1997, often referred to as Nationalists
 Nazi Party - a political party existing in Germany between 1920 and 1945, officially named the National Socialist German Workers' Party

Pertaining to regions and nation-states
 Arab nationalism
 African nationalism
 American nationalism
 Armenian nationalism
 Baloch nationalism
 Bangladeshi nationalism
 Basque nationalism
 Belgian nationalism
 Bodo nationalism
 Bulgarian nationalism
 Breton nationalism
 British nationalism
 Canadian nationalism
 Chinese nationalism
 Cornish nationalism
 Corsican nationalism
 Croatian nationalism
 English nationalism
 French nationalism
 Galician nationalism
 German nationalism
 Greek nationalism
 Icelandic nationalism
 Indian nationalism
 Irish nationalism
 Japanese nationalism
 Korean nationalism
 Lebanese nationalism
 Muslim nationalism in South Asia
 Pan-European nationalism
 Pakistani nationalism
 Quebec nationalism
 Romanian nationalism
 Russian nationalism
 Scottish nationalism
 Serbian nationalism
 Slavic nationalism (disambiguation)
 Sinhalese Buddhist nationalism
 Spanish nationalism
 Tibetan nationalism
 Turkish nationalism
 Welsh nationalism
 Ulster nationalism

Pertaining to races, religion or ideologies
 Black nationalism
 Hindu nationalism
 Left-wing nationalism
 Pan-nationalism
 Pan-Islamism
 Religious nationalism
 White nationalism

See also
 The Nationalist (disambiguation), several publications
 National Party (disambiguation)